Johannes "Hans" Schelling (27 October 1954, Leiderdorp – 20 May 2008, Zoetermeer) was a sailor from the Netherlands, who represented his country at the 1988 Summer Olympics in Pusan. With Henry Koning as helmsman, Schelling took the 15th place in the Flying Dutchman.

Sources
 
 
 
 
 

1954 births
2008 deaths
People from Leiderdorp
Dutch male sailors (sport)
Sailors at the 1988 Summer Olympics – Flying Dutchman
Olympic sailors of the Netherlands
Sportspeople from South Holland
20th-century Dutch people